0 to 100 may refer to:

 0 to 100 / The Catch Up, 2014 single by Drake
 0 to 100 km/h, a measure of acceleration (or, less commonly, 0 to 100 mph)
 The act of losing one's temper (slang)